The men's 5000 metres event at the 1997 Summer Universiade was held at the Stadio Cibali in Catania, Italy on 26 and 28 August.

Medalists

Results

Heats

Final

References

Athletics at the 1997 Summer Universiade
1997